Bosnia and Herzegovina competed at the 1996 Summer Olympics in Atlanta, United States.

Athletics

Men
Track and Road Events

Women
Track and Road Events

Canoeing

Slalom
Men

Judo

Men

Shooting

Men

Swimming

Men

Women

Table tennis

Men

Wrestling

Men's Greco-Roman

References
Official Olympic Reports

Nations at the 1996 Summer Olympics
1996
Olympics